The International Society of Military Sciences (ISMS) is an international organization whose stated aim is to build a strong network for the creation, development, exchange and diffusion of research and knowledge about war, conflict management and peace support efforts. The ISMS was founded in October 2008. The Austrian National Defence Academy, the Royal Military College of Canada, the Royal Danish Defence College, the Finnish National Defence University, the Netherlands Defence Academy, the Norwegian Defence University College, the Swedish National Defence College and the Baltic Defence College established this society with the intention to further research and academic education in military arts and sciences in the broadest sense.

Establishing the ISMS

In the summer of 2007 the Faculty of Military Sciences, Netherlands Defence Academy, started working on more international collaboration on an institutional level. Canada, Sweden and Austria were the first military institutes and universities which were approached for collaboration. Soon four other institutes joined in. In November 2011, the War Studies University in Warsaw and the Royal Military Academy (Belgium) were voted in. The Royal Military Academy of Belgium withdrew their membership before the council meeting in Oslo, May 2017. The latest induction to the ISMS is the Military University Institute in Portugal that was inducted during the Council meeting in Vienna, November 2019.

Letter of Intent

The formal signing of the Letter of Intent was on October 22, 2008 in Copenhagen. That day the participating academies also decided to formally present the ISMS in November 2009 during its first annual international conference which was to be held in the Netherlands. The theme of this first conference was “Security in 2020 in a Multi-Polar World”.

Letter of Intent

1) The undersigned institutions of Austria, Canada, Denmark, Finland, the Netherlands, Norway, and Sweden, and the Baltic Defence College (later referred to as the institutions) agree to establish a society intended to further research and academic education in military arts and sciences in the broadest sense. This association is titled International Society of Military Sciences (hereafter referred to as the Society).  
 
2) The purpose of the Society is to build a network for the creation, development, exchange and diffusion of research and knowledge about war, conflict management and peace support efforts.

3) The Society will establish an annual conference, and one or more workshops per year.  Activities include communications and publications to support a research network within topics such as: war studies; military history; military technology; command and control, leadership and basic competence; law and ethics; security and defence policy and strategy; armed forces and society; and defence economics and management. These are detailed in Annex A.

4) The representatives of the member institutions constitute the Council as the highest authority governing the Society.  The Council elects a Board governing the Society.  The purpose of the Board is to initiate and coordinate the activities of the Society.  The institution hosting the annual conference provides the secretariat for the Society for the period of one year.

5) Society members commit themselves to organise and participate in various workshops, conference or working groups, with the understanding that they will endeavour to lead at least one working group or workshop and participate in at least two others.  A tentative schedule of upcoming events is attached at Annex B.
 
6) The Society will be established for the four-year term in October 2008 upon signing of Letter of Intent by the institutions, and it is announced at the First Annual Conference. 
 
7) The first Annual Conference will be held in November 2009.  Invitations to participate in the Conference and to join the Society will be distributed widely.  The Council will consider applications for new membership by compatible organizations annually. However, participation in conferences and workshops is welcomed at any time.

Organizational Format
The ISMS is an institutional membership organization composed of higher military educational institutions in smaller and medium-sized nations. Membership of the ISMS is open to defence universities and colleges conducting research and teaching at the highest national level. The Charter specifically state that its members must be free to conduct research without political control and interference and they must operate in a political system with firm democratic control over the armed forces. More so, membership is by invitation only.

The governing body of the ISMS is the Council, which is made up of one representative of each member institution. The Chairmanship of the Council is assumed by the ISMS Presidency. The Presidency of the ISMS rotates on an annual basis between the member institutions. It is the role of the Presidency to host the annual ISMS conference. As of the Council-meeting in Oslo November 2017 the ISMS decided to elect a designated Council-member to act as the ISMS Secretary for a period three years. ISMS uses a thematic Working Group division where each working group is led by a Chairperson.

Presidencies and Presidents
The presidency of ISMS has been held by the following:
 2021-2022: Military University Institute, Portugal
 2020-2021: Royal Military College of Canada, Canada
 2019-2020: Finnish National Defence University, Finland - Professor Dr. Hannu H. Kari
 2018-2019: Austrian National Defence College, Vienna - Brigader General Dr. Wolfgang Peischel
 2017-2018: War Studies University, Poland - Professor Ryszard Szpyra
 2016-2017: Norwegian Defence University College, Norway - LtCol. Dr. Anders McD Sookermany
 2015-2016: War Studies University, Poland - Professor Ryszard Szpyra
 2014-2015: Finnish National Defence University, Finland - Professor Dr. Hannu H. Kari
 2013-2014: Austrian National Defence College, Vienna - Brigader General Dr. Walter Feichtinger
 2012-2013: Royal Danish Defence College, Copenhagen - Dr. Niels Bo Poulsen
 2011-2012: Royal Military College of Canada - Professor Houchang Hassan-Yari
 2010-2011: Baltic Defence College - Professor James Corum
 2009-2010: Swedish National Defence College - Professor Dr. Maja Kirilova-Eriksson
 2008-2009: Netherlands Defence Academy - Professor Alexander Bon

Annual ISMS Conferences
 2020, October 27–29: The twelfth annual ISMS conference are to be held by the National Defence University in Helsinki, Finland. The invites theme for the conference is "Military Sciences versus Open Sciences with the scent of COVID-19 pandemic." (Due to the COVID-19 pandemic the conference is moved to Zoom Video Communications.
 2019, November 18–20: The eleventh annual ISMS conference was hosted by the Austrian National Defense Academy in Vienna, Austria. The invited theme of the conference was "Military Science for the Benefit of Society." The conference program display 97 presentations in three parallel Working Group sessions totaling 21 panels with 94 oral presentations and one poster session with 3 poster presentations. Keynote speakers were Brigader General Dr. Wolfgang Peischel from the Austrian National Defense Academy, LtCol Dr. Anders McD Sookermany from the Norwegian Defence University College and Professor Christian Stadler from the University of Vienna.
 2018, October 18–19: The tenth annual ISMS conference was hosted by the War Studies University in Warsaw, Poland. The conference marked ISMS 10th anniversary and was themed "Military Sciences and Future Security Challenges."  The conference program display 85 presentations in four parallel Working Group sessions totaling 26 panels with 82 oral presentations and one poster session with 3 poster presentations. 
 2017, November 15–17: The ninth annual ISMS conference was hosted by the Norwegian Defence University College in Oslo, Norway. The conference was themed "Military Sciences - The Backbone of Military Education?" The conference Book of Abstract display 103 presentations in five oral sessions totaling 23 panels with 86 oral presentations and one poster session with 17 poster presentations. Approximately 150 persons from more than 25 nations across five continents attended the #ISMS17 conference. Keynote speaker was Professor of international politics Dr. Janne Haaland Matlary from the University of Oslo and adjunct professor to the Norwegian Defence University College.
 2016, October 12–14: The eight annual ISMS conference was hosted by the War Studies University in Warsaw, Poland. The conference was themed "Influence and War - Fighting for Minds". The conference program show that there were 28 panels divided among 10 working groups with a total of 95 presentations. Keynote speaker was Doctor Rafal Brzeski a journalist with 40 years of experience specializing in international relations.
 2015, October 13–15: The seventh annual ISMS conference was hosted by the Finnish National Defence University in Helsinki, Finland. The theme of the conference was "(R)evolution of War".  The conference had 66 extended abstracts and 18 full papers and about 170 participants from 21 nations.
 2014, October 21–23: The sixth annual ISMS conference was hosted by the Austrian National Defence Academy in Vienna, Austria. The theme for the conference was "Armed Forces for 2020 and beyond – Roles | Tasks | Expectations". The Book of Abstracts show that there were 60 abstracts divided among 9 working groups. Tentative key note speakers will include Lt.-Gen. Wolfgang Wosolsobe, Director-General, EU Military Staff.
 2013, November 12–14: The fifth annual ISMS conference was hosted by the Royal Danish Defence College in Copenhagen, Denmark. The conference was themed "Adapting to Change" and was attended by more than 150 scholars and military practitioners from around the world. The keynote speakers included Dr Matthew Burrows, National Intelligence Council and principal author of the NIC-report "Global Trends 2030", and the former Minister of Defense from the Republic of Estonia, Jaak Aaviksoo. 
 2012, October 23–24: The fourth annual ISMS conference was hosted by the Royal Military College of Canada in Kingston, Ontario. The ISMS covered all aspects of military and security studies. The theme of the conference was: “Balancing domestic and international security requirement”, focusing in particular on the high north, civil-military relations and budget austerity. Presenters featured researchers, operationally experienced military personnel and policy makers. Both days started with a plenary session, followed by multiple working group sessions and the opportunity to exchange knowledge and experience with other researchers and participants. The conference program show that there were 24 panels divided among 9 working groups with a total of 85 presentations.
 2011, November 8–10: The third annual ISMS conference was hosted by the Baltic Defence College in Tartu, Estonia. The theme was "Adapting to Modern Security Challenges." Keynote speakers were the Lithuanian Air Force Commander Major General Edvartas Mažeikis and Dr. Jaak Aaviksoo, Estonian Minister of Education and Research. The closing summary was made by Professor Žaneta Ozoliņa of the University of Latvia.
2010, November 10–11:  The second annual ISMS Conference was hosted by the Swedish National Defence College in Stockholm, Sweden. The theme was the need for further cooperation in defence related research projects. During the conference, scientists and scholars presented and discussed their research on Military Education; State Violence; Challenges facing small states in relation to security and defence; The future of Crisis Management; Gender and violence; and Defence technology – management and development in smaller states.
 2009, November 25–26: The first annual ISMS conference was hosted by the Netherlands Defence Academy, at the Naval Barracks in Amsterdam, the Netherlands. The theme was “Security in 2020 in a Multi-Polar World”. During the conference, scientists and scholars presented and discussed their research on conflict and warfare, ranging from the present conflict in Afghanistan to intelligence, military technology, and personnel management. Keynote speakers were Major-General (ret.) Patrick Cammaert, 2005-2007 Force Commander of the UN Mission to the Eastern Democratic Republic of the Congo (MONUC), Prof. Dr. Franz Kernic of the Swedish National Defence College and Dr. S.J.G. Reyn of the Policy Planning Staff, Dutch Ministry of Defence.

ISMS Working Groups
The ISMS Working Groups are communities of research interest, which disseminate knowledge within the community, and organize seminars at the annual conference.
 WG#1: War Studies
 WG#2: Military History
 WG#3: Military Technology
 WG#4: Leadership, Command and Control and Basic Competences
 WG#5: Law and Ethics 
 WG#6: Security and Defence Policy
 WG#7: Armed Forces and Defence Management 
 WG#8: Defence Management and Economics
 WG#9: Military Education
 WG#10: Strategy

Academic Work
The Council of the International Society of Military Sciences has formally given its scholarly support to the effort of putting together an OpenAccess Handbook of Military Sciences. The handbooks Editor-in-Chief Anders McD Sookermany and three of the Section Editors are Council Members of the ISMS: David M. Last, Wolfgang Peischel and Niels Bo Poulsen. Several of the identified authors of the approximately 60 chapter book are affiliated with the ISMS either through their military educational institution or have presented papers at the annual ISMS conference.

Sources

 
 Group: International Society of Military Sciences
 Swiss Federal Institute of Technology Zürich
 Official twitter account

References

External links
 The Official ISMS Website
 ETH Zurich
 International Association for Military Pedagogy (IAMP)
 European Research Group On Military And Society (ERGOMAS)
 International Military Testing Association (IMTA)

Military education and training